Robert Floyd may refer to:
Robert Floyd (actor) (born 1967), television and film actor
Robert L. Floyd (1918–2007), mayor of Miami, Florida
Bobby Floyd (born 1943), baseball player
Robert J. Floyd, state legislator in Florida
Robert W. Floyd (1936–2001), computer scientist